Muni Shri 108 Pragya Sagar Ji Maharaj is a Digambara monk.

Biography
Pragyasagar led to the construction of "Tapo Bhumi" tīrtha. He went to Mahamrityunjay Dwar on 8 November 2014, where he was received by the Jain community. He met Akhil Bharatiya Akhara Parishad chief Narendra Giri and general secretary Hari Giri at Tapo Bhumi on 17 March 2016. He said that people who do not respect their nation do not deserve to live in the country.

Pragyasagar celebrated Holi on 22 March 2016 with saffron at Mahavir Tapo Bhumi concluding the Vishwa Shanti Maha Yagya. He applied saffron tilak on the foreheads of his devotees after they washed his feet with saffron milk.

References

Indian Jain monks
21st-century Indian Jains
21st-century Jain monks
21st-century Indian monks
1972 births
Living people